Valeyres may refer to:

Valeyres-sous-Montagny, Vaud, Switzerland
Valeyres-sous-Rances, Vaud, Switzerland
Valeyres-sous-Ursins, Vaud, Switzerland